The River Calder is a river in West Yorkshire, in Northern England.

The Calder rises on Heald Moor in Lancashire close to the source of another river with the same name, and then flows east into West Yorkshire through green countryside, former woollen-mill villages and towns before joining the River Aire near Castleford.

The river's valley is generally known as the Calder Valley.  The name Calderdale usually refers to the large urban and rural borough (centred on Halifax) through which the upper river flows. The lower reaches flow through the boroughs of Kirklees (based on Huddersfield) and Wakefield. However, the river does not flow through the centres of Halifax and Huddersfield, which are on the Calder's main tributaries, Hebble Brook and the River Colne respectively. The only large town centres through which the Calder flows are Brighouse, Mirfield, Dewsbury and the city of Wakefield.

The river itself is only navigable in short sections, but these sections are connected by artificial "cuts" (e.g. Horbury Cut) to form the Calder and Hebble Navigation, a popular leisure waterway which is part of the connected inland waterway network of England and Wales.

Etymology 
The name 'Calder' is thought to come from the early Brythonic, meaning 'hard or violent water' (compare Modern Welsh caled "hard"),  or possibly from another Celtic language, meaning river of stones. This history is reflected in the name of a village, Walsden, in upper Calderdale, which is probably derived from Wales Dene, or "Valley of the "Welsh" ('Welsh' here referring to all 'Brythonic Celts') in Anglo-Saxon.

Geography 

It flows for a distance of around  through Cornholme, Todmorden, Eastwood, Hebden Bridge, Mytholmroyd, Luddendenfoot, Sowerby Bridge, Copley, Elland, Brighouse, Mirfield, Dewsbury, Horbury Bridge and on to Wakefield.

The catchment lies on Carboniferous rocks of Millstone Grit, and is heavily reservoired, with 39 reservoirs licensed to provide water. The river is joined by Hebden Water at Hebden Bridge, and by the River Ryburn at Sowerby Bridge; it is linked to the town of Rochdale, Greater Manchester across the Pennines via the Rochdale Canal.

For much of its length, the Calder is canalised and becomes the Calder and Hebble Navigation. It is also part of the Aire and Calder Navigation, and to the east of Castleford, it merges into the River Aire, going on to join the Humber Estuary and the North Sea.

History 

The river was central to establishment of the textile industries in the local area, and flows through the area known as the Yorkshire Heavy Woollen District. Many major mills were constructed along its banks, particularly at Dewsbury and Wakefield, but also in the smaller communities of Brighouse, Hebden Bridge, Sowerby Bridge and Todmorden, as well as along its tributaries: the Hebble at Halifax, and the Colne at Huddersfield. The mills in the Upper Calder Valley specialised in cotton weaving, with some cotton spinning, while those in the lower part of the valley specialised in wool and shoddy. Some of these structures still exist as listed buildings, although the large scale production of yarn and textile has now ceased.

The river formed an important transportation system for raw materials and the products of the mills, particularly prior to the development of other infrastructures such as road and railway links to the area. At many places, the river is not navigable because of weirs or the shallow depth, and passage for boats was made by the creation of cuts where boats are able to enter the Calder and Hebble Navigation. Work began to make the Calder navigable above Wakefield in 1758.

The chantry chapel on the bridge was licensed in 1356. At Wakefield, a variety of former mill buildings are currently being redeveloped to create a Waterfront project which will combine residential housing, offices, galleries and public spaces. The Hepworth Wakefield opened in 2011.

This also straightened out one of the larger curves in the river and was a cheaper option than building bridges to span the river. In 2015 a 100 kW hydro installation and fish pass was completed at Whalley Weir on the River Calder in Whalley. The micro hydroelectric generating plant uses a variable speed Archimedean screw. The weir at Kirkthorpe was adapted in 2017 to be a hydroelectric generating station, with a capacity of 500 kWh.

Filming location 
The valley's historic towns and cities have attracted film and television productions. Several films and television series have been filmed in the area, particularly around the town of Huddersfield. For example, portions of the BBC television series Happy Valley (2014) were filmed in Huddersfield; in addition to exteriors, some of the studio filming was done at North Light Film Studios at Brookes Mill, Huddersfield. As well, interiors for the BBC's Jamaica Inn, for the BBC's Remember Me and for ITV series Black Work, were also filmed at the studios. Many of the exteriors of the BBC series Jericho (2016) were filmed at the nearby Rockingstone Quarry and some interior work was done at North Light Film Studios.

Environmental

Wildlife and fish 

Until the 19th century, the Calder was home to large numbers of salmon but pollution from the textile and chemical industries along its banks led to the death of the salmon population by the mid 19th century. The last salmon on record was caught at Wakefield in 1850, however there is evidence that they are returning, with sightings on the lower river at Castleford in 2008 and alleged catchings much further upstream. Around Huddersfield, Mirfield and Wakefield are popular areas for coarse fishing, roach, perch, chub, dace, minnows, gudgeon, pike, bream and trout. The areas upstream of Dewsbury are quickly becoming cleaner and more suited to game and specialised river cyprinids like barbel, as well as general coarse fish that are also doing well.

Alongside the river are four Sites of Special Scientific Interest.

Recent improvements in reducing the amount of pollution have led to the return of native wildlife, such as the otter and kingfisher to stretches of the river.

Kingfishers are easily spotted (all year round, due to its orange underbelly) all the way up and down the river's course and are quite numerous around the Mirfield area.

Pollution 

The river has been heavily polluted by the textile industry, and, more recently, chemical works along its banks.

Close to its source at Heald Foot, the water is polluted by the remains of past opencast mining activities and a landfill site. This has also led to a significant amount of soil erosion, with major mudslides into the river and its tributaries in 1947, 1982, 1991 and 2001.

As the river reached Huddersfield, the traditional textile industries created a considerable amount of water pollution, particularly through the processes involved in the production of synthetic dyes and in scouring the wool clean. The enormous growth of the population over the last hundred years (currently over 800,000 people live within the river's catchment) has caused other problems in relation to sewage. Another major source of pollution until recently came from a disused tar distillery in Mirfield.

In the middle 1950s the river was so polluted by dyeworks in the middle reaches between Todmorden and Sowerby Bridge, that it ran different opaque colours from day to day. On Easter Monday, after a long weekend holiday shutdown, the water cleared and the river bottom could actually be seen, looking like a grey wool blanket. Tighter controls during the 1950s led to an improvement in water quality, and presently organisations such as Calder Future are working collaboratively with local industries and Yorkshire Water to promote more responsible use of the river and to re-establish lost wildlife along its banks.

Flooding and flood defences 

The river has a history of flooding, mainly due to the high sides of its banks in its earlier stages, which cause rapid runoff of water following heavy rain. Much of the lower part of the river has been urbanised, therefore trapping flowing water within the engineered river channels. Fast flows of water cause the deposition of sediment collected from the river banks, raising the river height further.

A variety of flood defences are in operation along the Calder Valley to prevent the recurrence of floods which devastated communities in the early part of this century. At Wakefield, for example, the lake at Pugneys Country Park is used as an overflow for the river in order to protect the town.

The recently regenerated Wakefield Waterfront area is defended by one of the most sophisticated flood defence systems in Europe. This complex of computer controlled automatic flood barriers are housed below ground and rise automatically when a flood threat is detected.

Leisure use of the river 

The river is host to a variety of watersports activities:
 a canoeing centre at Sowerby Bridge
 waterskiing in gravel pits at Cromwell Bottom
 watersports and angling at Pugneys Country Park
 the use of leisure craft and narrowboats along the lower stretch of the river where navigation is made easier through the canals built during the Industrial Revolution
 Walking routes along the Pennine Way and Calderdale Way
 Angling in areas is distributed between the following; Bradford No.1 angling association, Mirfield AC, Thornhill AC, and Wakefield AC. Some stretches are free and only require a valid Environment agency rod licence

See also
Rivers of the United Kingdom
List of crossings of the River Calder, West Yorkshire
Upper Calder Valley
Murder of Lindsay Rimer, unsolved 1994 case of a 13-year-old girl found murdered in the river

References

Sources 
Kirklees site about the River Calder
Rivers Info with images Retrieved 14 December 2007.

External links 

 Calder Future
 Wakefield Waterfront Project
 Calder Catchment Flood Management Plan
 Calder & Colne Rivers Trust

Rivers of Wakefield
Rivers of Kirklees
River navigations in the United Kingdom
Rivers of Calderdale
Aire catchment